The Philemon Foundation is a non-profit organization that exists to prepare for publication the Complete Works of Carl Gustav Jung, beginning with the previously unpublished manuscripts, seminars and correspondences. It is estimated that an additional 30 volumes of work will be published and that the work will take three decades to complete.

History 
The Foundation was established in 2003 to support the work of Sonu Shamdasani, a London-based historian, in his then ongoing work of preparing Jung's Red Book for publication. Shamdasani is the co-founder of the Philemon Foundation with American Jungian analyst Stephen A. Martin.

The works to date constitute the Philemon series.  Several translators and editors have contributed within the series, developing a few topical sub-series on dreams, psychology, correspondence, lectures.

Published works
Many publications currently comprise the published work of the Foundation, including Jung's internationally recognized Red Book.

The various individual works within the Philemon series have been published by different publishers, including Princeton University Press and W. W. Norton & Company.

In addition to the Red Book, the Philemon Series includes:

 The Jung-White Letters, 2007
 Children's Dreams, 2007
 Jung Contra Freud, 2012
 Introduction to Jungian psychology, 2012
 Analytical Psychology in Exile, 2015
 The Question of Psychological Types, 2015
 On Psychological and Visionary Art, 2015
 Dream Interpretation Ancient and Modern, 2016, (updated edition)
 Dream Symbols of the Individuation Process, 2019
 On Theology and Psychology, 2020
 History of Modern Psychology, 2020
 The Black Books, 2020
 Psychology of Yoga and Meditation, 2021
 Consciousness and the Unconscious, 2022

Current projects
 Jung on Ignatius of Loyola’s Spiritual Exercises, 2023
 Dreams and Symbolism: Jung’s 1925 Swanage Seminar and 1927 Zurich Seminar
 C. G. Jung: The Case of Wilhelmine Fässler (1903)
 Jung’s Unpublished Lectures at Polzeath on the Technique of Analysis and the Historical and Psychological Effects of Christianity (1923)
 Jung’s Unpublished Book on Alchemy and Individuation (1937)
 The Original Protocols for Memories, Dreams, Reflections
 Jung and the Indologists
 C. G. Jung’s 1933 Berlin Seminar
 On Active Imagination: Jung’s 1931 German Seminar
 ETH Lectures (1933-1941)

See also
 The Collected Works of C. G. Jung
 Bollingen Foundation
 e-rara.ch

Notes

Published full titles

References

External links
 Philemon Foundation

Carl Jung
Non-profit organizations based in California
Organizations established in 2003